Paraburkholderia graminis is a species of bacteria isolated from agricultural soils in France and Australia.

Notes

graminis
Bacteria described in 1998